This is a list of the 179 members of the Parliament of Denmark, in the 1984 to 1987 session. They were elected at the 1984 general election.

Election results

Seat distribution
Below is the distribution of the 179 seats as it appeared after the 1984 election, as well as the way it appeared at the end of the term.

Parliament members elected at the January 1984 election

Party and member changes after the January 1984 elections

Party changes
Below are all parliament members that have joined another party or become independent during the term.

Lasting member changes
Below are member changes that lasted through the entire term.

Temporary member changes 
Below are temporary member replacements during the term.

References

 
1987–1988